is a Japanese former Nippon Professional Baseball outfielder.

References 

1966 births
Living people
Baseball people from Kumamoto Prefecture 
Japanese baseball players
Nippon Professional Baseball outfielders
Yomiuri Giants players
Japanese baseball coaches
Nippon Professional Baseball coaches